Scholasticus was Exarch of Ravenna from 713 to 723.

In 713 he was appointed as exarch, the same year Anastasius II became Byzantine emperor and overthrew his Monothelite predecessor Philippicus. Scholasticus was charged with giving a letter to Pope Constantine, which described Anastasius' allegiance to orthodoxy, helping to heal the rift between Rome and Constantinople. Around 723, he was replaced as exarch by Paul.

References 

8th-century exarchs of Ravenna
8th-century deaths
Year of birth unknown
Leo III the Isaurian